Paul Brokaw is an expert on integrated circuit design who has spent most of his career at Analog Devices, where he holds the position of Analog Fellow. He is the inventor of many analog IC circuits, including the Brokaw bandgap reference and holds over 100 patents.  He is also an IEEE Fellow.

Publications

Awards and honors
 2021 - IEEE Donald O. Pederson Award in Solid-State Circuits

References
 
 
   Keynote and luncheon talks, ""Growing up with Batteries and Wires," Paul Brokaw, Fellow - Analog Devices, of "Brokaw Road" and "Brokaw Bandgap"".

External links
 A Transistor Voltage Reference, and What the Band-Gap Has To Do With It – This 1989 video features Paul Brokaw explaining his bandgap voltage reference.

Analog electronics engineers
Living people
Year of birth missing (living people)